Matías Gabriel Vera (born 20 November 1995) is an Argentine professional footballer who plays as a defensive midfielder for Argentinos Juniors on loan from Major League Soccer club Houston Dynamo.

Career

Nueva Chicago 
Vera started his career with Nueva Chicago and came through their youth ranks, serving as a captain for his teams. He originally played as a right winger and right back before his coaches moved him to defensive midfield due to his ball winning ability and natural instincts.  Vera was promoted to the first team during the 2015 Argentine Primera División season. He made his debut on 6 April in a 2–1 defeat to Banfield and went on to make 17 appearances across all competitions in his first season. Nueva Chicago were relegated to Primera B Nacional in 2015, where they remained for the next three seasons as Vera featured sixty-eight times for them in all competitions while also scoring twice, netting in games with All Boys and Atlético Paraná.

O'Higgins 
In January 2018, Vera joined Argentine Primera División side San Lorenzo. However, he was immediately loaned to O'Higgins of the Chilean Primera División.

His first appearance for O'Higgins was against Huachipato on 18 February 2018 in matchweek 1 of the Primera División season.  He would start the first 8 games of the season before he missed matchweek 9 after getting two yellow cards in the previous match.  He returned to the starting lineup for matchweek 10 Vera scored his first goal for O'Higgins on 25 August in a 1–1 draw with his first  Unión Española. Vera was suspended for their matchweek 29 game due to yellow card accumulation. He returned to the lineup in matchweek 30, the final week of the season, and scored in a 4–0 win over Audax Italiano. Vera started 30 out of a possible 32 games for O'Higgins, only missing out on 2 due to suspension. O'Higgins finished the season eighth in the table, missing out on qualification to 2019 Copa Sudamericana first stage to Unión Española on goal difference.

Houston Dynamo 
On 21 December 2018, Vera signed with the Houston Dynamo of Major League Soccer. The reported transfer fee was around $1 million.  Vera made his Dynamo debut on 19 February, playing all 90 minutes in a 1–0 win over CD Guastatoya in the CONCACAF Champions League. He played every minute of the tournament as Houston reached the quarter-finals, where they were eliminated by Tigres UANL. Vera made his MLS debut on 2 March in a 1–1 draw with Real Salt Lake, but he was sent off after picking up two yellow cards. He scored for the Dynamo for the first time on 11 June, netting in a 3–2 win over Austin Bold in the U.S. Open Cup. Although Houston missed out on the playoffs, Vera enjoyed a strong debut season, leading the team in minutes played with 2,639 in the league and 3,088 in all competitions. He was voted as the team MVP and Newcomer of the Year by local journalists and the Dynamo staff.

Vera and the Dynamo opened the season on February 29 with a 1–1 draw against the LA Galaxy.  After the second game of the year, the season was paused due to the COVID-19 pandemic, with play resuming in July.  Vera played in 20 of a possible 23 games in a shortened season, anchoring the Dynamo midfield.  He served as team captain for 11 of the games during the season, as the primary captain, Boniek Garcia, missed time with an injury and also featured primarily as a substitute.  It was another poor season for the Dynamo as a team, finishing bottom of the Western Conference and failing to qualify for the playoffs again.

On 16 April 2021, Vera made his first appearance of the season, playing the full 90 minutes in a 2–1 win over the San Jose Earthquakes in matchweek 1.  He scored his first goal of the season, and first career MLS goal, on 29 May in a 3–2 loss to Sporting Kansas City.  On 21 August, Vera scored the equalizer to give the Dynamo a 2–2 draw against Texas Derby rivals FC Dallas.  He ended the season with 3 goals and 1 assist in 30 appearances, as the Dynamo finished last in the Western Conference again.  On 29 November 2021, Vera signed a new contract keeping him in Houston through the 2023 season, with a team option for 2024.

Vera featured frequently again in 2022, making 28 appearances (all starts) and recording 2 assists in the 2022 regular season  However the Dynamo missed out on the playoffs again after finishing 13th in the conference.

Loan to Argentinos Juniors 
On 9 January 2023, Vera returned to Argentina, joining Primera División side Argentinos Juniors on loan for the 2023 season.

Career statistics

Honors 
Houston Dynamo
 Dynamo Team MVP: 2019

 Dynamo Newcomer of the Year: 2019

References

External links

1995 births
Living people
Sportspeople from Buenos Aires Province
Argentine footballers
Association football midfielders
Argentine expatriate footballers
Expatriate footballers in Chile
Expatriate soccer players in the United States
Argentine expatriate sportspeople in Chile
Argentine expatriate sportspeople in the United States
Argentine Primera División players
Primera Nacional players
Chilean Primera División players
Major League Soccer players
Nueva Chicago footballers
San Lorenzo de Almagro footballers
O'Higgins F.C. footballers
Houston Dynamo FC players
Argentinos Juniors footballers